Edward Buehler Delk (1885–1956) was a prominent architect who designed many landmark buildings in the Midwest and Southwest regions of the United States.

Delk was born on September 22, 1885, in Schoharie, New York. He graduated from University of Pennsylvania in 1907. After serving in the Army Air Corps during World War I where he studied at the University of London after the war.

Among his most famous works were Spanish Colonial Revival Style architecture buildings in the 1920s for Kansas City developer J.C. Nichols and Oklahoma oilman Waite Phillips.

On September 1, 1956, Edward B. Delk died unexpectedly at sea aboard the S. S. Excambion while returning with his wife Jane from a trip to Europe. He was buried in Philadelphia, Pennsylvania.

Notable structures
Country Club Plaza (1920) – Kansas City, Missouri
Villa Philmonte (1926) – Cimarron, New Mexico
Philbrook Museum of Art (1927) – Tulsa, Oklahoma
Philtower (1927) - Tulsa, Oklahoma
Community Christian Church (1940) (taken over from Frank Lloyd Wright) – Kansas City, Missouri
Starlight Theatre (Kansas City)  (1951) – Kansas City, Missouri
LaQuinta Mansion (1932) - Bartlesville, Oklahoma

References
Kansas City Public Library resources
TulsaArchitecture.com Delk profile

1885 births
1956 deaths
People from Schoharie, New York
20th-century American architects
Bartlesville, Oklahoma
Frank Lloyd Wright